General Pakenham may refer to:

Edward Pakenham (1778–1815), British Army major general
Hercules Robert Pakenham (1781–1850), British Army lieutenant general
Thomas Pakenham, 5th Earl of Longford (1864–1915), British Army brigadier general
Ridley Pakenham-Walsh (1888–1966), British Army major general